Gary Cornish (born 10 April 1987) is a Scottish former professional boxer who competed from 2011 to 2018. He challenged once for the vacant Commonwealth heavyweight title in 2015.

Amateur career 
As a youngster, he played football for Brora Rangers. He decided to go to the local boxing gym only to improve his fitness for football. He fell in love with boxing, quickly discovering his talent for the sport. Trainers and seasoned fighters were not used to 6 ft 7in boxers who possessed such speed and athleticism, and as such it proved difficult to find suitable opponents. After a pursuit of football, he eventually returned to boxing, the sport where he had shown most ability, at age of 19. His amateur career was short, due to the difficulty in finding suitable opponents, and he turned professional with an amateur record of 9-0.

Professional career
His break out fight came in 2015, when he challenged Hungarian Zoltan Csala for the vacant IBO Inter-Continental Heavyweight title. Cornish dominated Csala and won the fight via a technical knockout in the fourth round.

Cornish vs. Joshua

On 12 September 2015, Cornish fought Anthony Joshua for the Vacant Commonwealth Belt. Cornish was stopped by the referee just 90 seconds into the fight. He was the first Scottish heavyweight to fight for the commonwealth heavyweight title.

Cornish remained largely absent from the public eye following the Joshua fight, but since regrouped in 2016 with two points victories in bouts fought in Scotland.

In 2017, he became the first Scottish boxer to fight for the British heavyweight title against Sam Sexton. His bid for the title proved unsuccessful, as he lost by unanimous decision to Sexton.
 
In March 2019, Cornish announced that he would be retiring from boxing on medical grounds after a brain scan. He described his decision to retire as "devastating".

Personal life
Cornish is proud of his Scottish heritage. He has a tattoo on his chest, saying "Alba gu bràth," which is a Scottish Gaelic phrase used to express allegiance to Scotland as it means 'Scotland forever'.

Professional boxing record

References

External links

 Twitter
 Facebook

1987 births
Living people
Scottish male boxers
Heavyweight boxers
Sportspeople from Inverness